Pál Széplaki (born 3 February 1945) is a Hungarian equestrian. He competed in the individual jumping event at the 1972 Summer Olympics.

References

1945 births
Living people
Hungarian male equestrians
Olympic equestrians of Hungary
Equestrians at the 1972 Summer Olympics
Sportspeople from Budapest